This is a list of educational institutions in Hyderabad, Sindh, Pakistan.

Schools
F.G Public No.1 Boys School Hyderabad Cantt
Army Public School & College System Hyderabad Cantt

Colleges
 Government College

Universities
 Government College University Hyderabad
 National University of Modern Languages, Hyderabad Campus
 Isra University
 Sindh Agriculture University, Hyderabad Campus
 SZABIST, Hyderabad Campus

References

Institutions
Hyderabad, Sindh
Hyderabad, Sindh